The first USSR championships were national teams competitions held in 1933-1936 and were officially called All-Union Volleyball Holidays.
Since 1938 the USSR championships were contested by club teams of DSOs and departments, with the exception of 1956, 1959, 1963 and 1967, when the USSR championships were held as part of the Summer Spartakiad of the USSR. In addition, in 1951 and 1952 together with the club teams of Moscow, Leningrad, RSFSR and Ukrainian SSR participated national teams of other Union republics, in the USSR championship of 1976 participated USSR national team and national teams of DSO and departments.  The scheme for holding the USSR championships has changed repeatedly. Until 1956, as well as in 1959, 1963 and 1967 the competitions were held in one city. Since 1957 the competitions were held in a round robin system, except 1968, when the final two rounds were played with separation. Games were played in 1-4 rounds, with the 1949 and 1958 championships requiring an ex.

Winners list

! Years
! Champions
! Runners-up
! Third Place
|-
| 1933|| Moscow  || Kharkov || Dnepropetrovsk
|-
| 1934|| Moscow  || Bakou || Dnepropetrovsk  Kharkov Rostov-Na-Donou
|-
| 1935|| Moscow  || Kharkov || Bakou
|-
| 1936|| Moscow  || Rostov-Na-Donou Tiflis || 
|- style="background:#ddd"
| 1937|| colspan="3" align="center" | Not Disputed
|-
| 1938|| Spartak Moscow  || CSKA Moscow || Rot-Front Moscow 
|-
| 1939|| Lokomotiv Moscow  || Spartak Moscow  || Medik Moscow  Naouka Leningrad
|-
| 1940|| Spartak Moscow  || Lokomotiv Moscow  || Spartak Kharkov 
|- style="background:#ddd"
| 1941|| colspan="3" align="center" | Not Disputed
|- style="background:#ddd" 
| 1942|| colspan="3" align="center" | Not Disputed
|- style="background:#ddd" 
| 1943|| colspan="3" align="center" | Not Disputed
|- style="background:#ddd" 
| 1944|| colspan="3" align="center" | Not Disputed
|-
| 1945    || Lokomotiv Moscow  || Spartak Moscow  || Spartak Leningrad
|-
| 1946|| Lokomotiv Moscow  || SKIF Moscow  || Spartak Leningrad
|-
| 1947|| Dinamo Moscow || Lokomotiv Moscow  || SKIF Moscow 
|-
| 1948|| Lokomotiv Moscow  || Spartak Leningrad || Dinamo Moscow
|-
| 1949|| Lokomotiv Moscow  || Dinamo Moscow || Spartak Leningrad. 
|-
| 1950|| Lokomotiv Moscow  || Spartak Leningrad || Dinamo Moscow
|-
| 1951|| Dinamo Moscow || Lokomotiv Moscow  || Spartak Leningrad
|-
| 1952|| Lokomotiv Moscow  || Dinamo Moscow || Spartak Leningrad
|-
| 1953|| Dinamo Moscow || Lokomotiv Moscow  || Medik Leningrad
|-
| 1954|| Dinamo Moscow || Lokomotiv Moscow  || Spartak Leningrad
|-
| 1955|| Dinamo Moscow || Lokomotiv Moscow  || Spartak Leningrad
|-
| 1956|| Moscow  || Ukraine || Leningrad
|-
| 1957|| Lokomotiv Moscow  || Dinamo Moscow || Spartak Leningrad
|-
| 1958|| Metrostroï  Moscow || Dinamo Moscow || CSK MO
|-
| 1959|| Leningrad || Moscow  || RSS  Lettonie
|-
| 1960|| Dinamo Moscow || Lokomotiv Moscow  || Daougava Riga
|-
| 1961|| Bourevestnik Ossa || Spartak Leningrad || SKIF Leningrad
|-
| 1962|| Dinamo Moscow || CSKA Moscow || Bourevestnik Ossa
|-
| 1963|| Moscow  || Leningrad || RSFSR
|- style="background:#ddd"
| 1964|| colspan="3" align="center" | Not Disputed
|-
| 1965|| CSKA Moscow || Lokomotiv Moscow  || Dinamo Moscow
|-
| 1966|| CSKA Moscow || Dinamo Moscow || Neftianik Bakou
|-
| 1967|| Moscow  || RSS  Azerbaïdjan || RSS  Ukraine
|-
| 1968|| CSKA Moscow || Spartak Irkoutsk || Bourevestnik Leningrad
|-
| 1969|| CSKA Moscow || Bourevestnik Leningrad || Dinamo Moscow
|-
| 1970|| Dinamo Moscow || Bourevestnik Leningrad || Lokomotiv Moscow 
|-
| 1971|| Dinamo Moscow || Lokomotiv Moscow  || Bourevestnik Ossa
|-
| 1972|| Dinamo Moscow || CSKA Moscow || Nefttchi Bakou
|-
| 1973|| Dinamo Moscow || CSKA Moscow || Iskra Vorochilovgrad
|-
| 1974|| CSKA Moscow || Dinamo Moscow || Iskra Vorochilovgrad
|-
| 1975|| Dinamo Moscow || Iskra Vorochilovgrad || CSKA Moscow
|-
| 1976|| URSS Team || VC Bourevestnik || VC Dinamo
|-
| 1977|| Dinamo Moscow || CSKA Moscow || Ouralotchka Sverdlovsk
|-
| 1978|| Ouralotchka Sverdlovsk || Iskra Vorochilovgrad || Dinamo Moscow
|-
| 1979|| Ouralotchka Sverdlovsk || CSKA Moscow || Dinamo Moscow
|-
| 1980|| Ouralotchka Sverdlovsk || TTU Leningrad  || CSKA Moscow
|-
| 1981|| Ouralotchka Sverdlovsk || Dinamo Moscow || Sokol Kiev
|-
| 1982|| Ouralotchka Sverdlovsk || CSKA Moscow || Medin Ossa
|-
| 1983|| Dinamo Moscow || Medin Ossa || Ouralotchka Sverdlovsk
|-
| 1984|| ADK Alma-Ata || Ouralotchka Sverdlovsk || Medin Ossa
|-
| 1985|| CSKA Moscow || Ouralotchka Sverdlovsk || ADK Alma-Ata
|-
| 1986|| Ouralotchka Sverdlovsk || ADK Alma-Ata || Kommounalnik Minsk
|-
| 1987|| Ouralotchka Sverdlovsk || CSKA Moscow || Kommounalnik Minsk
|-
| 1988|| Ouralotchka Sverdlovsk || ADK Alma-Ata || CSKA Moscow
|-
| 1989|| Ouralotchka Sverdlovsk || ADK Alma-Ata || Orbita Zaporojie
|-
| 1990|| Ouralotchka Sverdlovsk || ADK Alma-Ata || BZBK Bakou
|-
| 1991|| Ouralotchka Sverdlovsk || ADK Alma-Ata || Ouralotchka-2
|-

See also
Volleyball in Russia 
Russian Women's Volleyball Super League

References

External links
•  Soviet Union Championship Women

 

Soviet Union
1933 establishments in the Soviet Union
Volleyball in the Soviet Union
Soviet Women League